Erycides may refer to two different groups of organisms:
 Erycides, a synonym for Erycinae, a subfamily of snakes
 Erycides, a synonym for Phocides, a genus of butterflies